Cash Cowboys is a new reality show airing on Pop (U.S. TV network) produced by Associated Television International, currently airing on Pop TV and premiered on Saturday, November 4 at 11:00 a.m. ET/PT on Pop TV.

Cash Cowboys is a reality television show about, the Huwas, a Colorado-based family of farmers, modern cowboys and entrepreneurs.  The Huwas are a busy family with many hobbies they participate in together while also running numerous family businesses including a large land reclamation company reclaiming land that has been destroyed by naturally occurring disasters and more. Stemming from generations of farmers, the Huwas have obtained a unique skill set they apply to reclaiming and protecting Americas land.;

References

2017 Canadian television series debuts
2010s Canadian reality television series